This is a list of programmes broadcast by Mediacorp Channel U.

News and current affairs

Dramas

Local drama

Directional Debut Project (#Freshtakes)

These dramas are aired in hourly episodes, 9.00pm to 10.00pm at Mediacorp Channel U on 15 March 2019 and ends on 26 April 2019.

Hong Kong drama

TVB dramas in Mandarin

2001: Lady Flower Fist 苗翠花 (21 May 7pm Mon-Fri) - 20 episodes
2001: Once Upon a Time in Shanghai (TV series) 新上海灘 (21 May 10:30pm Mon-Wed) - 40 Episodes
2001: A Kindred Spirit 真情 (4 Jul 7pm Mon-Fri) - 590 Episodes
2001: Man's Best Friend 宠物情缘 (13 Aug 9pm Mon-Fri) - 20 Episodes
2001: Till When Do Us Part 冤家宜結不宜解 (9 Aug 8pm Thu-Fri) - 20 Episodes
2001: Feminine Masculinity 先生貴性 (3 Sep 10:30pm Mon-Wed) - 20 Episodes
2001: A Loving Spirit 全院滿座 (21 Sep 8pm Thu-Fri) - 20 Episodes
2001: Old Time Buddy 難兄難弟
2001: Old Time Buddy - To Catch a Thief 難兄難弟之神探李奇 (17 Oct 10:30pm Mon-Wed) - 25 Episodes
2001: Dark Tales II 聊齋（貳）(8 Nov 8pm Thu-Fri)
2001: One Good Turn Deserves Another 地獄天使 (12 Nov 10:30pm Mon-Wed) - 20 Episodes
2001: Taming of the Princess 醉打金枝 (8 Dec 8pm Every Saturdays) - 20 Episodes
2001: A Matter of Business 千里姻緣兜錯圈 (31 Dec 10:30pm Mon-Thu) - 20 Episodes
2002: The Flying Fox of Snowy Mountain (1999 TV series) 雪山飛狐 (7 Jan 9pm Mon-Fri) - 40 Episodes
2002: Simply Ordinary 林世荣 (5 Feb 10:30pm Mon-Thu) - 20 Episodes
2002: Mutual Affection 河东狮吼 (16 Feb 8pm Every Saturdays) - 20 Episodes
2002: Side Beat 兼职警察 (4 Mar 9pm Mon-Fri) - 20 Episodes
2002: Plain Love II 茶是故鄉濃 (1 Apr 9pm Mon-Fri) - 32 Episodes
2002: At the Threshold of an Era 创世纪 (6 May 9pm Mon-Fri) - 50 Episodes
2002: The Legend of Lady Yang 楊貴妃 (16 Jul 9pm Mon-Fri) - 20 Episodes
2002: Game of Deceit 骗中传奇 (23 May 8pm Wed-Fri) - 20 Episodes
2002: A Tough Side of a Lady 花木兰 (3 Jul 8pm Wed-Fri) - 20 Episodes
2002: Web of Love 网上有情人 (13 Jun 10:30pm Thu-Fri) - 20 Episodes
2002: When Dreams Come True 夢想成真 (14 Aug 9pm Mon-Fri (8pm wef 4 Sep Wed-Fri)) - 20 Episodes
2002: Anti-Crime Squad 反黑先鋒 (19 Aug 10:30pm Mon-Wed) - 22 Episodes
2002: Street Fighters 廟街·媽·兄弟 (2 Sep 9pm Mon-Fri) - 22 Episodes
2002: Incurable Traits 醫神華佗 (19 Sep 10:30pm Mon-Thu) - 20 Episodes
2002: The Threat of Love Loving You 我愛你 (22 Sep 10:30pm Every Sundays) - 10 Episodes
2002: Face To Face 雙面伊人 (20 Sep 8pm Wed-Fri) - 20 Episodes
2002: War of the Genders 男親女愛 (24 Oct 10:30pm Mon-Thu) - 50 Episodes
2002: Return of the Cuckoo 十月初五的月光 (2 Oct 9pm Mon-Fri) - 22 Episodes
2002: The Legendary Four Aces 金裝四大才子 (10 Dec 7pm Mon-Fri) - 50 Episodes
2002: Ups and downs 無業樓民 (5 Dec 8pm Thu-Fri) - 21 Episodes
2002: Healing Hands II 妙手仁心II (30 Dec 9pm Mon-Fri)
2003: Dragon Love 人龍傳說 (14 Feb 8pm Thu-Fri)
2003: A Taste of Love 美味情緣 (26 Feb 9pm Mon-Fri)
2003: Against the Blade of Honour 圓月彎刀 (19 Mar 10:30pm Mon-Thu)
2003: Life for Life 命轉情真 (20 Mar 8pm Thu-Fri & 7pm Sat-Sun)
2003: Lost in Love 大囍之家 (10 Apr 8pm Thu-Fri & 7pm Sat-Sun)
2003: The Green Hope 新鮮人 (2 May 8pm Thu-Fri & 7pm Sat-Sun)
2003: A Matter of Customs 雷霆第一關 (29 May 9pm Mon-Fri)
2003: Reaching Out 美麗人生 (30 May 8pm Thu-Fri & 7pm Sat-Sun(7pm wef from 27 Jun Mon-Fri))
2003: In the Realm of Success 公私戀事多 (28 Jun 8pm Thu-Fri & 7pm Sat-Sun)
2003: On the Track or Off 勇往直前 (14 Jul 9pm Mon-Fri)
2003: Colourful Life 錦繡良緣 (26 Jul 8pm Thu-Fri & 7pm Sat-Sun)
2003: Hope for Sale 街市的童話 (16 Aug 7pm Sat-Sun)
2003: Legal Entanglement 法網伊人 (4 Oct 7pm Sat-Sun)
2003: Law Enforcers 勇探實錄 (21 Oct 9pm Mon-Fri)
2003: Armed Reaction III 陀槍師姐III (17 Nov 9pm Mon-Fri)
2003: The Stamp of Love 肥婆奶奶扭計媳 (18 Nov 7pm Mon-Fri)
2003: Seven Sisters 七姊妹 (22 Nov 7pm Sat-Sun)
2003: The Awakening Story 婚前昏後 (31 Dec 9pm Mon-Fri)
2004: Love is Beautiful 无头东宫 (1 Feb 7pm Sat-Sun)
2004: Gods of Honour 封神榜 (4 Feb 7pm Mon-Fri)
2004: Invisible Journey 彩色世界 (6 Feb 9pm Mon-Fri)
2004: A Step into the Past 尋秦記 (9 Mar 9pm Mon-Fri)
2004: At Point Blank (TV series) 婚姻乏術 (27 Mar 7pm Sat-Sun)
2004: Whatever it takes 天子尋龍 (31 Mar 7pm Mon-Fri)
2004: The Monkey King: Quest for the Sutra 齊天大聖孫悟空 (28 Apr 7pm Mon-Fri)

2004: Country Spirit 酒是故鄉醇 (1 May 7pm Sat-Sun)
2004: The Trust of A Life Time 情事緝私檔案 (3 May 9pm Mon-Fri)
2004: A Road and a Will 香港人在广州 (27 May 5:30pm Mon-Fri)
2004: Where The Legend Begins 洛神 (31 May 9pm Mon-Fri)
2004: Burning Flame II 烈火雄心II (17 Jun 7pm Mon-Fri(10:30pm wef 19 Jul Every Mon))
2004: A Herbalist Affair 情牵百子柜 (19 Jul 7pm Mon-Fri)
2004: Witness to a Prosecution II 洗冤錄II(1 Aug 7pm Sat-Sun)
2004: Family Man 絕世好爸 (17 Aug 7pm Mon-Fri)
2004: Eternal Happiness 再生緣 (30 Aug 9pm Mon-Fri)
2004: Virtues Of Harmony 皆大欢喜(14 Sep 7pm (7:30pm wef 3 Jan 2005) Mon-Fri)
2004: A Case of Misadventure 騎呢大狀(25 Sep 7pm Sat-Sun)
2004: Crimson Sabre 碧血劍 (11 Oct 10:30pm Every Mondays (9pm wef 22 Nov) Mon-Fri)
2004: Kung Fu Soccer 功夫足球 (13 Nov 7pm (7:30pm wef 1 Jan 2005) Sat-Sun)
2005: Fight For Love 谈谈情练练武 (3 Jan 9pm Mon-Fri)
2005: Slim Chances 我要FIT一FIT (31 Jan 9pm Mon-Fri)
2005: Let's Face It 无考不成冤家 (7 Mar 9pm Mon-Fri)
2005: Golden Faith 流金岁月 (4 Apr 10pm Mon-Fri)
2005: The King of Yesterday and Tomorrow 九五至尊 (6 Jun 10pm Mon-Fri)
2005: Take My Word For It 谈判专家 (4 Jul 10pm Mon-Fri)
2005: Ups and Downs in the Sea of Love 十万吨情缘 (17 Aug 10pm Wed-Fri)
2005: Food for Life YUMMY YUMMY (Co-production) (5 Oct 10pm Wed-Fri)
2006: Greed Mask 谜情家族
2006: Vigilante Force 智勇新警界
2006: Armed Reaction IV 陀枪师姐IV (22 Jun 10pm Mon-Fri)
2006: Triumph In The Skies 冲上云霄 (7 Nov 10pm Mon-Fri)
2007: War and Beauty 金枝欲孽 (2 Jan 10pm Mon-Fri)
2007: Shine On You 青出于蓝 (3 Jan 7pm Mon-Fri)
2007: Angels of Mission 无名天使3D (13 Feb 10pm Mon-Fri)
2007: Hard Fate 翡翠恋曲
2007: Dreams of Colours 下一站彩虹
2007: To Get Unstuck In Time 隔世追凶
2007: Split Second 争分夺秒
2007: Shades of Truth 水浒无间道
2007: Love Bond 心花放 (6 Sep 10pm Mon-Fri)
2007: The Conqueror's Story 楚汉骄雄
2008: Revolving Doors of Vengeance 酒店风云
2008: Healing Hands III 妙手仁心III
2008: When Rules Turn Loose 识法代言人
2008: The Academy 学警雄心
2008: La Femme Desperado 女人不易做
2008: Forensic Heroes 法证先锋
2009: Under the Canopy of Love 天幕下的恋人
2009: Always Ready 随时候命
2009: Love Guaranteed 爱情全保
2009: Maiden's Vow 凤凰四重奏
2009: The Brink of Law 突围行动
2009: To Grow with Love 肥田喜事
2009: The Charm Beneath胭脂水粉
2009: Fathers and Sons 爸爸閉翳
2009: On the First Beat 學警出更
2009: The Family Link 师奶兵团
2010: Dicey Business 赌场风云
2010: War of In-Laws II 野蠻奶奶大戰戈師奶
2010: Steps 舞动全城
2010: Survivor's Law II 律政新人王II
2010: The Gentle Crackdown II 秀才爱上兵
2010: The Ultimate Crime Fighter 通天干探
2010: D.I.E 古灵精探
2010: Devil's Disciples 强剑
2010: Safe Guards 铁血保镖
2010: A Journey Called Life 金石良缘
2010: Catch Me Now 原来爱上贼
2010: The Money Maker Recipe 師奶股神
2010: When a Dog Loves a Cat 當狗愛上貓
2011: The Silver Chamber of Sorrows 银楼金粉
2011: Your Class or Mine? 尖子攻略
2011: Love Exchange 疑情别恋
2011: The Four 少年四大名捕
2011: Forensic Heroes II 法政先锋II
2011: A Pillow Case of Mystery 施公奇案
2011: Last One Standing 與敵同行
2011: Moonlight Resonance 溏心风暴之家好月圆
2011: The King of Snooker 桌球天王
2011: E.U. 學警狙擊
2011: The Threshold of a Persona ID精英
2011：Rosy Business巾帼枭雄
2011: A Great Way to Care 仁心解碼
2012: Sweetness in the Salt 碧血盐枭
2012: D.I.E. Again 古灵精探B
2012: The Greatness of a Hero 盛世仁傑
2012: The Stew of Life 有營煮婦
2012: Man in Charge 幕后大老爷
2014: The Mysteries of Love 談情說案
2015: Triumph in the Skies II 衝上雲霄II
2017: The Ultimate Addiction 點金勝手
2017: Ghost of Relativity 鬼同你OT

aTV Dramas

 2001: Healing Hearts 侠骨仁心
 2001: Young Hero Fong Sai Yuk/Young Master of Shaolin 少年英雄方世玉 (18 Jun 7pm (9pm wef 4 Jul) Mon-Fri)
 2001: Storm in Shanghai 上海風雲 (19 Nov 5:30pm Mon-Fri)
 2002: Silver Tycoon 银狐
 2002: Battlefield Network 电视风云
2003: Venture Against Time 子是故人來

Taiwanese drama 
Drama serials produced mostly by FTV or SET Taiwan which were imported to Channel U during SPH MediaWorks Channel U days (2001-2005) were dubbed in Mandarin from the original Taiwanese Hokkien dialogue marked in bold.

2005: Love at Dolphin Bay 海豚湾恋人
2005: Love At Aegean Sea 情定爱琴海
2005: The Prince Who Turns into a Frog 王子变青蛙
2005: Reaching for the Stars 真命天女
2006: Reality Of Love 2 吐司男之吻2-愛情本事
2006: Working Women Hi! 上班女郎
2006: Dan Shen Su She Lian Huan Pao 单身宿舍连环泡
2006: Purple Love 紫藤恋
2006: Marmalade Boy 橘子酱男孩
2006: Green Forest, My Home 绿光森林
2006: Mr. Fighting 格鬥天王
2007: The Little Fairy 天外飞仙 (Co-production)
2007: The Hospital 白色巨塔
2007: Hanazakarino Kimitachihe 花样少年少女
2007: Angel Lover 天使情人 (Co-production)
2007: Magicians of Love 爱情魔发师
2007: My Secret Garden 我的秘密花园
2008: Sound of Colors 地下铁
2008: Romantic Princess 公主小妹
2008: Corner with Love 转角遇到爱
2008: Campus Shrewd 不良笑花
2009: ToGetHer 爱就宅一起 (Same-day telecast as Taiwan)
2009: Why Why Love 换换爱
2009: Fated to Love You 命中注定我爱你
2009: Hot Shot 篮球火
2009: Momo Love 桃花小妹 (Same-day telecast as Taiwan)
2009: Hooping Dulcinea 斗牛。要不要
2010: Queen of No Marriage 败犬女王
2010: Down with Love 就想赖著妳 (Same-day telecast as Taiwan)
2010: Autumn's Concerto 下一站，幸福
2011: Love Keeps Going 美乐。加油 (Same-day telecast as Taiwan)
2011: Sunny Girl 陽光天使
2011: Material Queen 拜金女王
2012: The Fierce Wife 犀利人妻
2012: Absolute Darling 绝对达令 (Same-day telecast as Taiwan)
2012: While We Were Drunk 醉后决定爱上你
2012: Once Upon a Love 原來爱.就是甜蜜 (Same-day telecast as Taiwan)
2013: Fabulous Boys 原来是美男 (Same-day telecast as Taiwan)
2014：Sun After The Rain 雨後驕陽

South Korean drama

South Korean Drama 
2001: Autumn in My Heart 秋天的童话 (27 Sep 10:30pm Every Thursdays)
2001: All About Eve (South Korean TV series) 爱上女主播 (12 Oct 10:30pm (Every Thu-Fri wef 29 Nov) Every Fridays)
2002: Sunlight Upon Me 陽光情人夢 (4 May 10:30pm Every Saturdays)
2002: Mom and Sister 妈妈姐姐 (13 Jul 11pm Every Saturdays)
2002: Winter Sonata 冬季戀歌 (21 Sep 11pm Every Saturdays)
2003: My Love Patzzi 紅豆女之戀 (1 Nov 11pm Every Saturdays)
2004: Summer Scent 夏日香气 (7 Aug 11pm Every Saturdays)
2005: Yellow Handkerchief 黄色手帕
2005: My Fair Lady 窈窕淑女
2005: Stairway to Heaven 天国的阶梯
2005: Dating Now 现正恋爱中
2005: Lovers in Paris 巴黎恋人
2005: Bodyguard 保镖
2006: Present 礼物
2006: Stained Glass 玻璃画
2006: Little Bride 新娘18岁
2006: Jewel in the Palace 大长今
2006: Save the Last Dance for Me 最后之舞
2006: My Lovely Sam Soon 我叫金三顺
2006: Princess Hours 宫－野蛮王妃
2007: Be Strong, Geum-soon! 加油！金顺
2007: Precious Family 致父亲母亲
2007: Prince Hours 宫S - 我的野蛮王子
2007: Witch Yoo Hee 魔女宥熙
2007: Come Back, Soon-ae! 回来吧！顺爱
2007: Hwang Jin-i 黄真伊
2007: Coffee Prince 咖啡王子1号店
2008: My Girl 我的女孩
2008: Oh Su Jung VS Karl 青蛙王子拜金女
2008: Famous Princesses 传说中的七公主
2008: Coma 昏迷 (Telecast in Korean)
2008: Hearts of Nineteen 19岁的清纯
2008: Couple or Trouble 梦幻情侣
2008: The Legend 太王四神记
2008: Iljimae 一枝梅
2008: New Heart 赤子之心
2009: Sassy Girl, Chun-Hyang 豪杰春香
2009: Likeable or Not 爱也好恨也好
2009: Boys Over Flowers 流星花园 - 花样男子 (Same-day telecast as Taiwan)
2009: Daughters-in-Law 媳妇的全盛时代
2009: Glory of Family 家门的荣光
2009: Cruel Temptation 妻子的诱惑
2010: Hong Gil-dong, The Hero 快刀洪吉童 쾌도 홍길동
2010: The Grand Chef 食客 식객
2010: Here Comes Ajumma 欧巴桑，向前冲! 아줌마가 간다
2010: Three Brothers 不像三兄弟 수상한 삼형제
2010: Personal Taste 个人取向 개인의 취향
2010: Pink Lipstick 粉红色口红 분홍 립스틱
2011: Mom's Dead Upset 妈妈发怒了！엄마가 뿔났다
2011: Dong Yi 同伊 동이
2011: The Fugitive: Plan B 逃亡者 도망자 Plan.B
2011: Brilliant Legacy 灿烂的遗产 찬란한 유산
2011: Queen Seondeok 善德女王 선덕여왕
2011: You're Beautiful 原來是美男 미남이시네요
2012: Iron Daughters In Law 不屈的儿媳妇 불굴의 며느리
2012: Prosecutor Princess 檢察官公主 검사 프린세스
2012: Jumong 朱蒙 주몽
2012: Secret Garden 秘密花园 시크릿 가든
2012: Bread, Love and Dreams 面包王子金卓求 제빵왕 김탁구
2012: Queen In-hyun's Man 仁显王后的男人 인현왕후의 남자
2013: Ice Adonis 黄色复仇草 노란 복수초
2013: Dr. Jin 仁医 닥터 진
2013: My Husband Got a Family 顺藤而上的你 넝쿨째 굴러온 당신
2013: City Hunter 城市猎人 시티헌터
2013: Smile Again 笑吧东海! 웃어라 동해야
2013: Glory Jane 榮光的在仁 영광의 재인
2013: Wild Romance 暴力羅曼史 난폭한 로맨스
2013: Lie to Me 甜言蜜语 내게 거짓말을 해봐
2013: Moon and Stars For You 愿为你摘星揽月 별도 달도 따줄게
2013: My Princess 我的公主 마이 프린세스

China drama 

2005: The Shining Teenagers 十八岁的天空
2005: Shanghai Love Story 千年之恋
2005: Demi-Gods and Semi-Devils 天龙八部
2005: { The Dragon Heroes }
2005: The Legend of Arching Hero 射雕英雄传
2006: Romance In The City 男才女貌
2006: Chinese Paladin 仙剑奇侠传 (Co-production)
2006: The Three Musketeers 风尘三侠之红拂女
2006: The Strange Tales of Liao Zhai 聊斋 (Co-production)
2006: The Little Fairy 天外飞仙 (Co-production)
2007: Qing Gong Fengyun 清宫风云
2007: The Return of the Condor Heroes 神雕侠侣
2008: Sword Stained with Royal Blood 碧血剑
2008: Royal Tramp 鹿鼎记
2009: The Legend of the Condor Heroes 射雕英雄传
2009: Paladins in Troubled Times 大唐游侠传
2010: The Heaven Sword and Dragon Saber 倚天屠龙记
2011: Painted Skin 画皮
2012: A Story Of Lala's Promotion 杜拉拉升职记

Japanese drama 

2005: Good Luck!! 梦想起飞
2005: Style! 造型师
2005: Pride 冰上悍将
2005: Last Christmas 爱在圣诞节
2005: The Great White Tower 白色巨塔
2005: Emergency Room 24 hours Series 3 救命病栋24小时3
2007: Engine 引擎
2009: Absolute Boyfriend 绝対男友
2011: My Pitiful Neighbour 美丽邻人
2011: Galileo 神探伽利略
2012: The After-Dinner Mysteries 謎解きはディナーのあとで
2014: Doctor X ドクターX
2014: Doctor X2 ドクターX2
2015: Code Blue コード・ブルードクターヘリ緊急救命
2015: Hanzawa Naoki 半沢直樹

Varieties

Other country varieties

Local varieties
2005: Man Enough 男人本色
2005: Say Cheez 好摄2人组
2005: Love Bites 缘来就是你
2005: A New You 亮丽秀出
2005: Foodball Tic Tac Goal 食在好球
2005: Project SuperStar 绝对SuperStar
2005: Smile With Oral B ORAL B 笑一笑 比一比
2005: When We Were Together 当我们同在一起
2005: It's You 非你莫属
2005: SuperFunkies 绝对大玩家
2005: Man O Man 男人帮
2005: Planetshakers 自游疯
2005: Shoot! 有话就说
2005: City By Night 夜森林
2005: Superhost 超级主持人
2005: Closet Affair IN女皇
2005: Makan King 好吃王
2005: Love Bites 2 缘来就是你2
2006: Condo and the City 寓望城市
2006: Campus SuperStar 校园SuperStar
2006: Weekend Escapade 周末万岁
2006: Quick Cuisine 30分钟煮一餐
2006: Seeking the Right One 选好就结婚
2006: On The Beat 都是大发现
2006: Wardrobe S.O.S 抢救衣橱大作战
2006: SuperBand 非常SuperBand
2006: Hey Hey Taxi 比比接车无比乐
2006: Dollar & Sense 神机妙算
2006: Follow Your Dreams 随心所欲
2006: Taking Off 起飞
2006: Shoot!2 有话就说2
2006: What's Art 什么艺思?
2006: The 7-Eleven Game Show 7-Eleven抢先夺快争第一
2006: Night Walk 步夜城
2006: Say I Do 爱要怎么说
2006: Fit The Bill 人健人爱
2006: Project SuperStar2 绝对SuperStar2
2006: Man O Man 2 男人帮2
2006: Closet Affairs 2 IN女皇2
2006: Makan King 2 好吃王2
2007: Chinese New Year 101 温故知新年
2007: Never Too Old 新领屋
2007: Way to Go 冤家路窄
2007: Roadtrip 自游旅行摄
2007: Music Is In The Air 音乐格斗场
2007: I Cook For U 名厨上菜
2007: Adventure Clicks 代你看世界
2007: On The Beat 2 都是大发现2
2007: Campus SuperStar2 校园SuperStar 2
2007: Lead Me On 贤人指路
2007: Hey! Gorgeous 校花校草追赶跑
2007: Law By Law 赢了LAW
2007: Campus Yummy Hunt 美食大专攻
2007: Wow Singapore 全新体验
2007: Shoot 3 有话就说3
2007: S-POP HURRAY! S-POP万岁!
2008: U Are The One 唯我独尊
2008: Hair Challenge 101 护发挑战101
2008: F&B Heroes 餐饮英雄榜
2008: Instant Chef 家简成厨
2008: On The Beat 3 都是大发现3
2008 CelebriTea Break 艺点心思
2008: SuperBand2 非常SuperBand 2
2008: Women on Top 女人大主意
2008: Come Dance with Me 与心共舞
2008: Man vs Machine 妙手铁厨
2008: Go Green 绿设兵团
2009: Campus SuperStar2009 校园Superstar 2009
2009: The Way We Live 缘走天涯
2009: Destination Most Wanted 优游天下
2009: On the Beat 4 都是大发现4
2009: Amuse U! 又管我去那里
2009: Live A Life U质人生
2009: CelebriTea Break 2 艺点心思2
2009: Stars For A Cause 明星志工队
2009: Singapore Flavours 万里香
2009: Diminishing Horizons 消失地平线
2009: Going Home 回家走走
2010: U're The Man 花样型男
2010: Legendary Cuisines 传说中的料理
2010: On the Beat 5 都是大发现5
2010: Stars For A Cause 2 明星志工队2
2010: Food Notes 上食堂
2010: Evolution 一起看过去
2011: Let's Talk 你在囧什么？
2011: Going Home 2 回家走走2
2011: Ladies Nite 女人俱乐部
2011: Hands of Love 大手牵小手
2011: Legendary Cuisines 2传说中的料理（二）
2011: Let's Talk 2 你在囧什么？2
2012: Let's Talk 3 你在囧什么？3
2013: Campus SuperStar2013 校园Superstar 2013
2013: ePuff 娱乐泡芙 S1
2013: Hey! Gorgeous 校园美魔王
2013–2014: Let's Talk 4 你在囧什么？4
2014: ePuff 娱乐泡芙 S2
2014–2015: Let's Talk 5 你在囧什么？5
2015: Going Home 3 回家走走3
2015: Mars Vs. Venus 金星火星大不同

See also
List of programmes broadcast by Channel 5 (Singapore)

References

 
Channel U Programmes
Channel U (Singapore)